Galaxaura barbata is a species of Pacific marine algae belonging to the family Galaxauraceae. It is a critically endangered plant.

Distribution 
It was located at Post Office Bay, Isla Santa María, Galápagos Islands.

Taxonomy 
It was named by Ruth Chen-Ying Chou  in "Pacific marine algae of the Allan Hancock Expeditions to the Galapagos Islands." Allan Hancock Pacific Expeditions 12: i-iv

References 

Nemaliales